The C&C 53 is a Canadian sailboat, that was designed by Cuthbertson & Cassian (C&C Design) and first built in 1976.

Production
The design was built by Bruckmann Manufacturing, the custom division of C&C Yachts, in Canada. Only a single example was built by Bruckmann, on a male mold. The sole example completed was named Inferno.

Design
The C&C 53 is a recreational keelboat, built predominantly of fibreglass with balsawood cores. It has a masthead sloop rig, a raked stem, a raised reverse transom, an internally-mounted scimitar-shaped, spade-type rudder controlled by a wheel and a highly swept, fixed fin keel. It displaces .

See also
List of sailing boat types

References

Keelboats
1970s sailboat type designs
Sailing yachts
Sailboat type designs by C&C Design
Sailboat types built by C&C Yachts